Katsina, likely from "Tamashek" (meaning son or blood) or mazza (men) with "inna" (mother) is a Local Government Area and the capital city of Katsina State, in northern Nigeria.

In 2016, Katsina's estimated population was 429,000.

The city is the centre of an agricultural region production of groundnuts, cotton, hides, millet and guinea corn and also has mills for producing peanut oil, and steel, it was also a center for large scale poultry farming of cows, goats, sheep and chickens.

The city has a largely Muslims population mainly from the Hausa and Fulani ethnics group.

Former Nigerian late President Umaru Yar'adua was a nobleman of Katsina.

The incumbent Governor of Katsina State is Aminu Bello Masari, who was sworn in as the executive Governor of the State on 29 May 2015, who had succeeded Barrister Ibrahim Shema.

Katsina Emirate
The Katsina Royal Palace known as 'Gidan Korau' is a huge complex located in the centre of the ancient city. It is a symbol of culture, history and traditions of 'Katsinawa'. According to historical account, it was built in 1348 CE by Muhammadu Korau, who is believed to have been the first Muslim King of Katsina. This explains why it is traditionally known as 'Gidan Korau' (House of Korau). It is one of the oldest and among the first generation palaces, along with Daura, Kano and Zazzau. The palace was encircled with a rampart, 'Ganuwar Gidan Sarki' (which is now gone). The main gate which leads to the palace is known as 'Kofar Soro', while the gate at the backyard is called 'Kofar Bai' (now gone). The Emir's residential quarters at the epicenter of the Palace is a large compound built in the typical traditional architectural style. The current Emir of Katsina is Alhaji Abdulmumini Kabir Usman.a Fulani legacy.

Other local governments

Katsina State has 34 local governments. The local governments area of Katsina is an area of 142 km2, with a population of 318,459 at the 2006 census. The local government are as follows:

Source: Katsina culture and history board, office of the surveyor of Katsina State

The postal code of the area is 820.

History
Surrounded by city wall  in length, Katsina is believed to have been founded circa 1100. In pre-Islamic times, Katsina's semi-divine ruler was known as the Sarki, who faced a summary death-sentence if found to be ruling incompetently. From the 17th to the 18th century, Katsina was the commercial heart of Hausaland and became the largest of the seven Hausa city-states. Katsina was conquered by the Fulani during the Fulani War in 1807. In 1903, the Emir, Abubakar dan Ibrahim, accepted British rule, which continued until Nigerian independence from Britain in 1960.

During sub-Saharan trade, the city of Katsina was known to be one of the most vibrant and strong commercial centres, and was believed to be the strongest with the Hausa kingdoms in terms of commerce, trade and craft. The German explorer Friedrich Hornemann reached Katsina, the first Westerner to do so, at the beginning of the 19th century.

The city's history of western-style education dates back to the early 1950s, when the first middle school in northern Nigeria was established (Katsina Teachers College). There are now several institutions of higher learning, including two universities: Umaru Musa Yar'adua University and the private Alqalam University, a polytechnic Hassan Usman Katsina Polytechnic and a Federal College of Education, Katsina. The city of Katsina is also home to an 18th-century mosque featuring the Gobarau Minaret, a  tower made from mud and palm branches.

2020 Boko Haram incident 
In December, 2020, over 300 schoolboys were kidnapped from their boarding school in Katsina. 344 of the boys were returned safely within a week. Boko Haram took credit for the incident, but local officials expressed skepticism about the claim, noting that Boko Haram had not been previously active in the region.

Higher education institutions in the city of Katsina 

Umaru Musa Yar'adua University, Katsina (UMYU)
Alqalam University, Katsina  (former Islamic University Katsina)
Hassan Usman Katsina Polytechnic
Federal College of Education, Katsina
Katsina State Institute of Technology and Management (KTSITM)
National Open University of Nigeria (NOUN)
Cherish Enterprises Institute
Katsina Community College of Education

Geography

Climate
According to the Köppen climate classification system, Katsina has a hot semi-arid climate, abbreviated BSh on climate maps.

Rainfall 

The table below shows record of rainfall from 1990 to 2019 obtained from Nimet Katsina.

Source: Nigerian Meteorological Agency, Katsina 2021.

Temperature 
Temperature is the degree of hotness or coldness of a body or place.

Maximum temperatures 

The table below contains the highest temperature each month from 1985 to 2017.

Source: Nigerian Meteorological Agency, Katsina, 2021

Lowest Temperatures 

Source: Nigerian Meteorological Agency, Katsina 2021

Notable people
Umaru Musa Yar'Adua
Muhammad Buhari
Muhammad Ibn Muhammad Al-Fulani Al-Kishwani

See also
Federal Medical Centre, Katsina

References

External links

 
State capitals in Nigeria
Local Government Areas in Katsina State
Cities in Nigeria